The Mexican Center League was a Class C Minor League Baseball circuit that operated in 1956 and 1957.

History
By 1955, the outlaw Mexican League was struggling for survival during its confrontation against Major League Baseball. As a result, Anuar Canavati, president of the Sultanes de Monterrey team, led a group of new owners that helped make the league part of Organized Baseball as a Class AA circuit in 1955. On the other hand, he encouraged the creation of the Mexican Center League, which operated as a Class C circuit between 1956 and 1957, as a support for the Mexican League. Canavati also served as president of the six-team league during its brief period of existence.

Cities represented/Teams
Aguascalientes, Aguascalientes
Rieleros de Aguascalientes  (1956)
Tigres de Aguascalientes  (1957)
Chihuahua, Chihuahua
Dorados de Chihuahua (1956–1957)
Ciudad Juárez, Chihuahua
Indios de Ciudad Juárez (1956–1957)
Durango, Durango
Alacranes de Durango (1956–1957)
Fresnillo, Zacatecas
Mineros de Fresnillo  (1956)
Rojos de Fresnillo  (1957)
Saltillo, Coahuila
Saraperos de Saltillo (1956–1957)

Standings

1956

1957

Sources

1956 establishments in Mexico
1957 disestablishments in Mexico
Defunct baseball leagues in Mexico